The 2015–16 Conference USA men's basketball season began with practices in October 2015, followed by the start of the 2015–16 NCAA Division I men's basketball season in November.

Preseason

Preseason Polls

Preseason All-Conference Team

Rankings

Conference schedules

Conference matrix
This table summarizes the head-to-head results between teams in conference play.

Honors and awards

Players of the Week
Throughout the conference regular season, the C-USA offices named one or two players of the week and one or two freshmen of the week each Monday.

All-Conference USA Awards and Teams

Postseason

Conference USA Tournament

The conference tournament is scheduled for March 8–12 at Legacy Arena in Birmingham, AL.

NCAA tournament

National Invitation Tournament

Vegas 16 Tournament

References